Joseph McCrum Belford (August 5, 1852 – May 3, 1917) was an American politician and a United States Representative from New York.

Biography
Born in Mifflintown, Juniata County, Pennsylvania, Belford attended Lycoming College in Williamsport, Pennsylvania.  He graduated from Dickinson College in 1871 and was a member of Phi Kappa Psi. His wife was Inez H. Belford.

Career
Belford moved to Long Island, New York, in 1884 and taught at the Franklinville and Riverhead Academies. He studied law, was admitted to the bar in 1889, and practiced in Riverhead. He served as secretary and chairman of the Suffolk County Republican committee and was clerk of the surrogate court.

Elected as a Republican to the Fifty-fifth Congress, Belford held the office of U.S. Representative for the first district of New York from March 4, 1897, to March 3, 1899. He was not a candidate for renomination in 1898 to the Fifty-sixth Congress and in 1900 was a delegate to the Republican National Convention at Philadelphia.

Resuming the practice of law in Riverhead (town), New York, Belford also engaged in banking. He served as surrogate judge of Suffolk County from 1904–1910.

Death
Belford died suddenly in Grand Central Station, Manhattan, New York County, New York, on May 3, 1917 (age 64 years, 271 days). He is interred at Riverhead Cemetery, Riverhead, Long Island, New York.

State Senator Edward Hawkins (1829–1908) was his father-in-law; Congressman James Burns Belford (1837–1910), of Colorado, was his cousin.

References

External links

1852 births
1917 deaths
People from Juniata County, Pennsylvania
Dickinson College alumni
New York (state) lawyers
Politicians from Suffolk County, New York
Republican Party members of the United States House of Representatives from New York (state)
19th-century American politicians
19th-century American lawyers